Vittorio Chierroni (26 May 1917 – 29 July 1986) was an Italian alpine skier who competed in the 1936 Winter Olympics and in the 1948 Winter Olympics.

Biography
He was born in Abetone, Tuscany, like Zeno Colò and Celina Seghi, and he finished 18th in the alpine skiing combined event at the 1936 Winter Olympics.

During World War II he participated in the 1941 "World Cup" in Cortina d'Ampezzo that was not subsequently approved by the FIS because many nations opposing the war were absent. At this event, Chierroni won the gold medal in slalom.

National titles
Chierroni won 14 medals (10 wins) at the Italian Championships: 6 in downhill, 5 in slalom and 3 in combined.

Italian Alpine Ski Championships
Downhill: 1936, 1938, 1940, 1943, 1947 (5)
Slalom: 1935, 1940 (2)
Combined: 1935, 1936, 1940 (3)

References

External links
 
 Alpine skiing 1936 

1917 births
1986 deaths
Year of death uncertain
Sportspeople from the Province of Pistoia
Italian male alpine skiers
Olympic alpine skiers of Italy
Alpine skiers at the 1936 Winter Olympics
Alpine skiers at the 1948 Winter Olympics
Alpine skiers of Fiamme Gialle